Arenigiphyllum is a genus of alga from the Ordovician that falls in the coralline stem group.  Only its vegetative anatomy is known.

See also

References

Red algae genera